New Kids on the Block Live was the fifth concert tour by American band New Kids on the Block and the first in 14 years since the group broke up after their last tour in 1994. In April 2008, the group reunited on the Today Show, announcing a new album and tour. The tour visited North America and Europe. The tour took place from the fall of 2008 through the summer of 2010. Each year, the tour was revamped with new staging, setlist and tour name. In 2009, the tour was acknowledged as The "Full Service Tour" and in 2010, the tour was known as the "Casi-NO Tour".

Opening acts
 Natasha Bedingfield (North America) (select venues)
 Lady Gaga (North America) (select venues)
 Tami Chynn (North America) (select venues)
 Shontelle (Europe) (select venues)
 JabbaWockeeZ (North America) (select venues)
 Colby O'Donis (North America) (select venues)
 Jesse McCartney (North America) (select venues)

Setlist

Tour dates

Music festivals and other miscellaneous performances

 This concert was a part of Borderfest Music Festival 2009.
 These concerts were a part of the New Kids on the Block Cruise 2009.
 This concert was a part of Virgin Festival Canada.
 This concert was a part of a Toys for Tots Benefit.
 These concerts were a part of the New Kids on the Block Cruise 2010.

Cancellations and rescheduled dates

October 14, 2008 Albuquerque Tingley Coliseum
November 24, 2008 Portland Rose Garden Arena
June 7, 2009 Bristow Nissan Pavilion at Stone Ridge was rescheduled to Fairfax, Virginia  Patriot Center
July 13, 2009 El Paso Don Haskins Center
August 1, 2009 Perth Burswood Dome
August 3, 2009 Adelaide Adelaide Entertainment Centre
August 4, 2009 Melbourne Rod Laver Arena
August 6, 2009 Newcastle, New South Wales Newcastle Entertainment Centre
August 8, 2009 Boondall Brisbane Entertainment Centre
August 10, 2009 Sydney Acer Arena
August 15, 2009 Wollongong WIN Entertainment Centre

Box office score data

Broadcasts and recordings

The 2008–2009 tour was chronicled on the documentary, "Coming Home". The film featured a behind the scenes process of the group making the latest studio album, "The Block" and preparation for the upcoming tour. The footage is interlaced with performances of their biggest hits. It also features a new song "Coming Home", which was a potential addition to the album. The song was performed for the first time at the Toys for Tots benefit show. The group describes the fill as "a love letter to the fans". As a part of the promotion of releasing the documentary, NKOTB held a "Demand Us!" contest where fans could "demand" that NKOTB come to their city and host a DVD screening party at a local theatre. The cities that won were New York, Seattle, and Wheeling, West Virginia. A DVD was released on February 10, 2010, followed by showings on Palladia HD.

References

New Kids on the Block concert tours
2008 concert tours
2009 concert tours
2010 concert tours